William Lloyd (born 7 May 1949) is a former professional tennis player from Australia.

Biography
Lloyd, who was born in Sydney, won the junior doubles title at the 1968 Australian Championships, partnering Phil Dent.

He joined the University of Southern Illinois in 1969 where he played collegiate tennis and he spent the 1970s competing on the professional circuit, as well as World TeamTennis.

During his career he competed in the main draw of all four grand slam tournaments. He lost a marathon match at the 1972 Wimbledon Championships to Wanaro N'Godrella, 9–11 in the fifth set. At the 1975 US Open he and Phil Dent had a win over Björn Borg and Rod Laver en route to the quarter-finals. His best performance in a grand slam tournament was a semi-final appearance in the mixed doubles at the 1978 French Open, with Trish Bostrom.

He is now a New South Wales based barrister.

References

External links
 
 

1949 births
Living people
Australian male tennis players
Australian Championships (tennis) junior champions
Tennis players from Sydney
Southern Illinois University alumni
Grand Slam (tennis) champions in boys' doubles